Karints Rural LLG is a local-level government (LLG) of Southern Highlands Province, Papua New Guinea.

Wards
01. Puinj 1
02. Puinj 2
03. Map 1
04. Map 2
05. Wambip 1
06. Imila
07. Melant
08. Humbura 1
09. Humbura 2
10. Tulum 1
11. Tulum 2
12. Posulim
13. Pembi
14. Kusi
15. Pingirip
16. Semb Marep 1
17. Marep 2
18. Paip
19. Mulim
20. Heip
21. Bela
22. Kamberep
23. Was 1
24. Was 2
25. Topa
26. Hum

References

Local-level governments of Southern Highlands Province